A-IX-2 (or hexal) is a Russian explosive used in modern Russian military shells. It consists of 73% RDX with 23% aluminum powder, phlegmatized with 4% wax. Its Relative effectiveness factor is 1.54.

It has been in use by the Red Army since WWII.

References

External links
 

Explosives